Top Model po-russki, cycle 5 (subtitled as Топ-модель по-русски: Международный cезон) (English: Top Model in Russian: International season) was the fifth and final installment of the Russian adaptation of Tyra Banks' America's Next Top Model. Two years after the shows initial cancellation following the conclusion of cycle 4, it was announced that the show would be returning with a fifth cycle. This cycle featured returning panel members of previous cycles, including Vlad Lisovets (cycles 2 and 3), and Ksenia Sobchak (host, cycles 1-3), as well as a new judge, Denis Simachev. The host of the cycle was Natasha Stefanenko, who previously hosted Italia's Next Top Model during its four-year run.

The cycle aired from October to December 2014. It featured contestants from several different countries (namely Angola, Belarus, Canada, Estonia, Israel, Spain, the United Kingdom and the United States) as well as Russia, all of whom had Russian roots. Notably, two of the contestants had previously competed on other versions of Top Model: Juste Juozapaityte, who finished in second place on cycle 7 of Britain & Ireland's Next Top Model; and Kristine Smirnova, who finished in second place on cycle 2 of Eesti tippmodell.

The prize package for this cycle included a fashion spread in Glamour magazine, a campaign for s.Oliver, a cash prize of 1,000,000 rubles, and a modelling contract with Point Model Management. The winner of the competition was 21-year-old Evgeniya Nekrasova from Kemerovo.

Cast

Contestants
(Ages stated are at start of contest)

Judges
 Natasha Stefanenko (host)
 Vlad Lisovets
 Denis Simachev
 Ksenia Sobchak

Episodes

Results

 The contestant was immune from elimination
 The contestant was eliminated
 The contestant quit the competition
 The contestant was the original eliminee, but was saved
 The contestant was eliminated outside of judging panel
 The contestant won the competition

Episode 2 = Kecantikan Editorial Dengan Semut

Episode 3 = Pameran Seni "Fashion Terimpit" Di Dalam Sebuah Peti Kaca

Episode 4 = Supermodel Profesional Di Dalam Pemotretan Foto Kalender

Episode 5 = Ratu Ekosistem Bawah Laut Di Atas Arena Ice Skating

Episode 6 = Pemotretan Seductive Liar dan Seductive Kecantikan Menggunakan Api

Episode 7 = Mewujudkan "Angelic Reincarnation" Dengan Terbang Digantung Dihutan

Episode 8 = Fashion Gila Dengan Miniatur Organ, Kampanye Kesehatan Dalam Video Dan Foto

Episode 9 = Wanita Pejuang Apocalypstic

Episode 10 = Skenario Berbeda Seorang Lady Belanda Di Pemukiman Sederhana Era 1800's

Episode 11 = Penguasa Laut Belanda Era Reinassance Di Kapal Dengan Suasana Dramatis

Episode 12 = Video Musik Mempresentasikan Personality, Kibasan Gaun Kanal Amsterdam, Avant Garde Couture Di Kota (WT) & Turbin (BT)

Episode 13 = Runway Elemental

Notes

References

Top Model series (Russia)
2014 Russian television seasons